Lansdowne Park, a rugby stadium in Blenheim, New Zealand, is one of the two home grounds for Mitre 10 Cup team Tasman, the other being Trafalgar Park in Nelson. It was also home to Marlborough until they merged with Nelson Bays to form Tasman, and is currently home to two Blenheim clubs, Harlequins and Central.

References

Rugby union stadiums in New Zealand